The Ontario Lassie Stakes is a Canadian Thoroughbred horse race run annually at Woodbine Racetrack in Toronto, Ontario. Open to Ontario-bred two-year-old fillies, it is contested on Polytrack synthetic dirt over a distance of  miles (8.5 furlongs).

Inaugurated at Toronto's Greenwood Raceway in 1979, it was raced there through 1993 at a distance of one mile. In 1994, the race was moved to Woodbine Racetrack and set at  miles.

The Ontario Lassie Stakes was run in two divisions in 1995.

Records
Speed  record: 
 1:45.32 - Inspired Kiss (1999) (on natural dirt)
 1:43.98 - Resentless (2009) (on Polytrack)

Most wins by an owner:
 4 - Sam-Son Farm (1984, 1986, 1987, 1993)

Most wins by a jockey:
 3 - Robin Platts (1982, 1990, 1994)
 3 - Todd Kabel (1991, 1999, 2006)
 3 - Emma-Jayne Wilson (2005, 2014, 2015)

Most wins by a trainer:
 4 - James E. Day (1984, 1986, 1987, 1993)
 4 - Roger Attfield (1989, 1992, 1995, 2000)

Winners since 1999

Earlier winners

1998 - Last Vice
1997 - Wait for Silence
1996 - Mordacious
1995 - Trillia (1st div)
1995 - Heavenly Valley (2nd div)
1994 - Mips
1993 - Quiet Cheer
1992 - Hey Hazel
1991 - Parisinthespring
1990 - Grecian Earn
1989 - Bundle Bits
1988 - Sweet Briar Too
1987 - Tilt My Halo
1986 - Water Chimes
1985 - Grecian Touch
1984 - In My Cap
1983 - Sinister Spinster
1982 - Regal Taheka
1981 - Lady Treego
1980 - Muskoka Weekend
1979 - Girls 'L Be Girls

References
 The 2008 Ontario Lassie Stakes at The Bloodhorse.com

Restricted stakes races in Canada
Flat horse races for two-year-olds
Horse races in Canada
Recurring sporting events established in 1979
Woodbine Racetrack
1979 establishments in Ontario